Livingston is a town in Orangeburg County, South Carolina, United States. The population was 136 at the 2010 census.

Geography
Livingston is located at  (33.553570, -81.120511).

Demographics

As of the census of 2000, there were 148 people, 60 households, and 43 families residing in the town. The population density was 183.8 people per square mile (70.5/km2). There were 67 housing units at an average density of 83.2 per square mile (31.9/km2). The racial makeup of the town was 81.76% White, 15.54% African American, and 2.70% from two or more races.

There were 60 households, out of which 26.7% had children under the age of 18 living with them, 63.3% were married couples living together, 8.3% had a female householder with no husband present, and 28.3% were non-families. 25.0% of all households were made up of individuals, and 16.7% had someone living alone who was 65 years of age or older. The average household size was 2.47 and the average family size was 2.93.

In the town, the population was spread out, with 23.6% under the age of 18, 3.4% from 18 to 24, 26.4% from 25 to 44, 32.4% from 45 to 64, and 14.2% who were 65 years of age or older. The median age was 43 years. For every 100 females, there were 85.0 males. For every 100 females age 18 and over, there were 85.2 males.

The median income for a household in the town was $31,250, and the median income for a family was $39,167. Males had a median income of $28,000 versus $16,250 for females. The per capita income for the town was $13,751. There were 4.5% of families and 5.6% of the population living below the poverty line, including 3.6% of under eighteens and 22.7% of those over 64.

References

External links
Information about the Town of Livingston from Orangeburg County

Towns in Orangeburg County, South Carolina
Towns in South Carolina